The  is a limited express train service in Japan operated by JR Shikoku which runs from  to .

The Uwakai service was introduced on 21 November 1990.

Route
The main stations served by this service are as follows.

 -  -

Rolling stock
 2000 series 3- or 4-car tilting DMUs (from 1993)

Past rolling stock
 KiHa 181 series DMUs (1990–1993)
 KiHa 185 series DMUs (1990–1993)

History
 November 1990: Uwakai services start between Matsuyama and Uwajima.
 March 1993: 2000 series tilting DMUs are introduced.

References

 JR Timetable, August 2008 issue
 "ＪＲ新幹線＆特急列車ファイル" (JR Shinkansen & Limited Express Train File), published 2008 by Kōtsū Shimbun

External links

 JR Shikoku Train Information 

Named passenger trains of Japan
Shikoku Railway Company
Railway services introduced in 1990